Trenton Charles Thompson (born July 27, 1996) is an American football defensive tackle for the Vegas Knight Hawks of the Indoor Football League (IFL). He played college football at the University of Georgia. Thompson graduated from Westover Comprehensive High School in Albany, Georgia, where he earned All-USA Defensive Player of the Year honors by USA Today. While he was in high school, scouts compared him to All-Pro defensive tackle Ndamukong Suh.

High school career
A native of Albany, Georgia, Thompson attended Westover Comprehensive High School where he was coached by Octavia Jones and former NFL defensive lineman Jeff Hunter. In his junior season, Thompson recorded 83 tackles (38 for loss) and 12 sacks, helping Westover to a third-round GHSA 4A playoff berth and its first region title in school history. He was named Junior of the Year by recruiting service Rivals.com. In his senior season, Thompson tallied 84 tackles, including 36 tackles for loss and four sacks, one interception and one forced fumble. He was named the Class 4A Defensive Player of the Year by The Atlanta Journal-Constitution, as well as National Defensive Player of the Year by USA Today.

Unanimously regarded as one of the top recruits across all positions, Thompson was heavily recruited by elite NCAA Division I football programs, including Alabama, Florida State, Louisiana State, Michigan State, Auburn, and Southern California. His first offer came from Georgia while he was still a sophomore. When he verbally committed to Georgia over Auburn and Alabama in August 2014, he cited Georgia's early recruiting effort as one of the reasons: “Georgia, they were my first offer. They were the first coaches that came down to see me and showed me the most love.” He signed a National Letter of Intent on February 4, 2015.

College career
Starting his college career with “stardom widely expected,” Thompson was projected as a space-eater in the mold of former Florida State nose tackle Timmy Jernigan, whom Georgia's defensive coordinator Jeremy Pruitt coached in 2013. Thompson played mostly in the second half during the first four games of the 2015 season, where he recorded 7 total tackles including a half a sack. On October 3, 2015, Thompson, listed as a defensive end, made his first start for the Bulldogs in a week 5 loss to the #13 Alabama Crimson Tide, where he recorded four total tackles. Thompson finished his true freshman year with 25 tackles (8 of which were solo), 2.5 tackles for a loss, and half a sack. Pro Football Focus listed him as the best true freshman on the interior defensive line, along with Missouri's Terry Beckner. In January 2018, Thompson declared his intent to forgo his senior year at Georgia and enter the 2018 NFL Draft.

Professional career

Cleveland Browns
After going undrafted in the 2018 NFL Draft, Thompson signed a free agent deal with the Cleveland Browns. He was waived on July 30, 2018.

Arizona Hotshots
Thompson was signed by the Arizona Hotshots of the Alliance of American Football on January 18, 2019. He made the final roster on January 30, 2019.

After a four tackle performance in a 38-22 week 1 victory over the Salt Lake Stallions, Thompson was named by Pro Football Focus to their Week 1 AAF  Team of the Week.

Washington Valor
After the AAF ceased operations in April 2019, Thompson signed with the Washington Valor of the Arena Football League (AFL) on May 9, 2019.

Edmonton Eskimos
Thompson signed with the Edmonton Eskimos of the Canadian Football League (CFL) on June 6, 2019. He was released before the start of the regular season on June 9.

Houston Roughnecks
On October 9, 2019, Thompson was entered into the XFL draft pool. He was selected by the Houston Roughnecks during the 2020 XFL Draft held on October 15 and 16, 2019. He signed a contract with the team on January 16, 2020. He was waived during final roster cuts on January 22, 2020.

Team 9
Thompson was signed to the XFL's practice squad team, referred to as Team 9, on January 30, 2020. He had his contract terminated when the league suspended operations on April 10, 2020.

Saskatchewan Roughriders
Thompson signed with the Saskatchewan Roughriders of the CFL on April 20, 2020. After the CFL canceled the 2020 season due to the COVID-19 pandemic, Thompson chose to opt-out of his contract with the Roughriders on August 31, 2020. He opted back in to his contract on January 14, 2021. He was released on May 20, 2021.

Vegas Knight Hawks
On September 1, 2022, Thompson signed with the Vegas Knight Hawks of the Indoor Football League (IFL).

References

External links
 Georgia Bulldogs bio
  by MaxPreps

1996 births
Living people
American football defensive tackles
Arizona Hotshots players
Cleveland Browns players
Georgia Bulldogs football players
Edmonton Elks players
Houston Roughnecks players
Washington Valor players
Players of American football from Georgia (U.S. state)
Sportspeople from Albany, Georgia
Team 9 players
Saskatchewan Roughriders players